The 1994 Individual Speedway World Championship was the 49th edition of the official World Championship to determine the world champion rider.

It was the last championship to be staged in the traditional single meeting World Final format before the advent of the Speedway Grand Prix series in 1995. The Final was held on 20 August at the Speedway Center in Vojens, Denmark.

Sweden's Tony Rickardsson won the first of what would prove to be a record equalling 6 World Championships, defeating Danish former triple champion Hans Nielsen and Australia's Craig Boyce in a runoff after all three riders finished on 12 points.

Qualification

Australian Qualification

Australian Final
 January 22, 1994
  Mildura, Olympic Park Speedway
 First 4 to Commonwealth Final plus 1 reserve

New Zealand Qualification

New Zealand Final
 February 5, 1994
  Stratford, Stratford Speedway
 First 2 to Commonwealth Final

British Qualification

British Final
 May 1, 1994
  Coventry, Brandon Stadium
 First 10 to Commonwealth Final plus 1 reserve

Swedish Qualification

Swedish Final
 May 24, 1994
  Kumla, Kumula Speedway
 First 5 to Nordic Final plus 1 reserve

Danish Qualification

Danish Final
 May 28-29, 1994
  - 2 Rounds (Holstebro & Randers)
 First 5 to Nordic Final plus 1 reserve

Intercontinental Round

American Final
 May 22, 1994
  Ventura, Ventura Raceway
 First 5 to Overseas Final plus 1 reserve
 Sam Ermolenko seeded to Overseas Final

Commonwealth Final
 May 22, 1994
  King's Lynn, Norfolk Arena
 First 10 to Overseas Final plus 1 reserve

Overseas Final
 June 12, 1994
  Coventry, Brandon Stadium
 First 9 to World Semi-final plus 1 reserve

Nordic Final
 June 12, 1994
  Eskilstuna, Smedstadion
 First 9 to World Semi-final plus 1 reserve

Continental Round

World Semi-finals

Semi-final 1
 July 10, 1994
  Bradford, Odsal Stadium
 First 8 to World Final plus 1 reserve

Semi-final 2
 July 10, 1994
  Prague, Markéta Stadium
 First 8 to World Final plus 1 reserve

World Final
 August 20, 1994
  Vojens, Vojens Speedway Center

References

External links

The finals at SVT's open archive 

1994
World I
Speedway competitions in Denmark
1994 in Danish motorsport